James J. Carrigan (born April 25, 1941) is an American attorney and politician who served in the Massachusetts General Court.

Early life
Carrigan was born on April 25, 1941 in Malden, Massachusetts. He graduated from St. Mary's High School and Suffolk University and went on to work as a teacher.

Political career
In 1970, Carrigan was elected to the Massachusetts House of Representatives. During his first term, state senator Charles V. Hogan died and Carrigan won the special election to succeed him. However, Carrigan was unable to win a full term, as he lost the 1972 Democratic primary to Walter J. Boverini by under 500 votes.

Legal career
Carrigan later returned to Suffolk and earned a Juris Doctor from the Suffolk University Law School. He was admitted to the Massachusetts bar in 1977.

References

1941 births
Suffolk University alumni
Suffolk University Law School alumni
Democratic Party Massachusetts state senators
Democratic Party members of the Massachusetts House of Representatives
Politicians from Lynn, Massachusetts
Living people